The St. Nicholas Serbian Church is a Serbian Orthodox church in the Avram Iancu Square of Timișoara's Mehala district. There are two other churches in this square, the Romanian Orthodox Church of the Ascension and the Roman Catholic Church of St. Mary. The St. Nicholas Church is together with the Serbian Orthodox Cathedral in Cetate's Union Square and the St. George Church in Fabric's Trajan Square one of the three Serbian Orthodox churches in the city.

History 
The first settlers of Mehala, the Rascians, belonged to the Orthodox religious community. In 1744 they founded their then joint Serbian-Romanian parish. The St. Nicholas Church is the oldest documented building of the Mehala district and was built of brick between 1786 and 1793. Its tower houses an old clock mechanism and five bells. In the 19th century, the interior carpentry and the iconostasis were executed. The chairs were made by Gheorghe Liblaitner, the furniture of the iconostasis by Mihajlo Janić, and the icons are the work of the painter Sava Petrović. The painting of the interior walls was done by Nicolae Alexici. The church saw gun firing during the Hungarian Revolution of 1848 and was later used as an animal shelter for six months. It was rehabilitated in 1870 from donations from parishioners. In 1887 the Orthodox parish split into a Romanian and a Serbian denomination, and the church was given to the Serbian Orthodox believers. The Romanian Orthodox believers built their own church in Avram Iancu Square, which had to be replaced after 25 years due to dilapidation. At the same place, in 1925, the foundation stone was laid for the largest building of Mehala, the Romanian Orthodox Church of the Ascension.

The St. Nicholas Church has had a huge impact on the Serb community in the area. It once had a denominational school, a football team that played matches in Croatia and Serbia and an active choir called Zora. In the past, each member of the choir wore a special badge.

References 

Religious buildings and structures in Timișoara
Serbian Orthodox church buildings in Romania
Historic monuments in Timiș County